Herbert Todd Allen (January 14, 1885 – January 17, 1971) was a Negro leagues third baseman and manager from 1908 to 1925, playing mostly with the Indianapolis ABCs.

Allen was born in Wheatland, Indiana, in 1885. By 1908, at the age of 23, he was playing third base for the Indianapolis ABCs. He played most of his seasons for the ABCs, including a winter season with a mostly ABCs team that played for the Royal Poinciana Hotel in West Palm Beach, Florida.

After the ABCs, Allen played for a number of years for the French Lick Plutos and the Lincoln Giants. He appeared as late as 1925 for the Indianapolis ABCs.

After baseball, his World War II draft card shows he was working for Hook Drug Company at the corner of California and Market Street, and living in Indianapolis, Indiana. It also lists his closest relative, likely his wife, as Jessie Allen.

References

External links
 and Baseball-Reference Black Baseball Stats and  Seamheads

1885 births
1971 deaths
Negro league baseball managers
Indianapolis ABCs players
French Lick Plutos players
Lincoln Giants players
People from Knox County, Indiana
Baseball players from Indiana
20th-century African-American sportspeople